Daniel de Pauli Oliveira (born 6 August 1999), known as Daniel Oliveira or simply Daniel, is a Brazilian professional footballer who plays for Goiás. Mainly a defensive midfielder, he can also play as a central defender.

Club career
Born in Goiânia, Goiás, Daniel Oliveira was a Goiás youth graduate. He made his senior debut on 21 August 2019, starting in a 4–1 home routing of Brasiliense, for the year's Copa Verde.

Promoted to the first team ahead of the 2020 season, Daniel Oliveira played his first match of the season on 24 January of that year, coming on as a second-half substitute for Henrique Almeida in a 3–2 Campeonato Goiano home win against Aparecidense. He made his Série A debut on 16 August 2020, replacing Victor Andrade in 1–1 away draw against Palmeiras.

Career statistics

References

External links
 Futebol de Goyaz profile 

1999 births
Living people
Sportspeople from Goiânia
Brazilian footballers
Association football defenders
Association football midfielders
Campeonato Brasileiro Série A players
Goiás Esporte Clube players